Frances Solia (born 20 September 1976) is a Samoan netball player in the ANZ Championship, playing for the Waikato/Bay of Plenty Magic in New Zealand. She previously played for the Central Pulse, where she was captain in 2008. She was the captain of the Samoan National Netball Team until 2011.

She retired in 2012 in order to start a family.

References
Central Pulse team profiles page

1976 births
Living people
New Zealand netball players
Samoan netball players
New Zealand sportspeople of Samoan descent
Waikato Bay of Plenty Magic players
Central Pulse players
ANZ Championship players
Capital Shakers players